José Leonardo Chirino Airport , is an airport serving Coro, the capital of Falcón state in Venezuela. It is named to honor José Leonardo Chirino, leader of a 1795 rebellion in Coro that called for the abolition of slavery and the establishment of a democratic republic.

The runway length includes a  displaced threshold on Runway 27.

The Coro VOR-DME (Ident: CRO) is located on the field.

See also
Transport in Venezuela
List of airports in Venezuela

References

External links

OurAirports - Coro
OpenStreetMap - Coro
SkyVector - Coro

Airports in Venezuela
Buildings and structures in Falcón
Buildings and structures in Coro, Venezuela